Stephen Engel is an American television producer and writer. He is an executive producer of two Disney Channel original series A.N.T. Farm and Mighty Med.

He wrote several television series such as Dream On, Mad About You, Alright Already, Just Shoot Me!, The War at Home, A.N.T. Farm and The Big Bang Theory.

Engel is an alumnus of Tufts University and New York University School of Law.

References

External links

Television producers from California
American television writers
American male television writers
New York University School of Law alumni
Tufts University alumni
Writers from Los Angeles
Living people
Year of birth missing (living people)
Screenwriters from California